Félix Morales Alfonso (born 9 June 1953) is a Cuban basketball player. He competed in the men's tournament at the 1976 Summer Olympics and the 1980 Summer Olympics.

References

External links
 Félix Morales at Latinbasket

1953 births
Living people
Cuban men's basketball players
Olympic basketball players of Cuba
Basketball players at the 1976 Summer Olympics
Basketball players at the 1980 Summer Olympics
Centers (basketball)
Place of birth missing (living people)